Actinin is a microfilament protein. Alpha-actinin-1 is necessary for the attachment of actin myofilaments to the Z-lines in skeletal muscle cells, and to the dense bodies in smooth muscle cells. The functional protein is an anti-parallel dimer, which cross-links the thin filaments in adjacent sarcomeres, and therefore coordinates contractions between sarcomeres in the horizontal axis.

The non-sarcomeric alpha-actinins, encoded by ACTN1 and ACTN4, are widely expressed. ACTN2 expression is found in both cardiac and skeletal muscle, whereas ACTN3 is limited to the latter.  Both ends of the rod-shaped alpha-actinin dimer contain actin-binding domains.

Mutations in ACTN4 can cause the kidney disease focal segmental glomerulosclerosis (FSGS).

See also
 Actin
 Muscle contraction

References

External links
 

EF-hand-containing proteins